The Banking Code was a voluntary code of practice agreed by banks in certain countries.  The code typically described how banks dealt with accepting deposits and withdrawals and with customer disputes on transactions.  Banking codes have in most countries been replaced by government imposed financial regulation governing banking practices.

United Kingdom
On 1 November 2009 the Financial Services Authority (FSA) Banking Conduct Regime commenced. It applies to the regulated activity of accepting deposits, and replaces the non-lending aspects of the Banking Code and Business Banking Code (industry-owned codes that were monitored by the Banking Code Standards Board).

The Banking Code had also regulated legal liability of banks for disputed debit and credit card transactions. On 1 November 2009 it was superseded by the FSA Payment Services Regulations 2009, amongst other things making banks legally liable for transactions unless they could prove that customers had authorised them.

Australia
In the wake of Australia's Financial Services Royal Commission, Australia's Banks updated its Banking Code. The voluntary Code was endorsed by the corporate regulator Australian Securities and Investments Commission (ASIC) on 31 July 2018. 

The voluntary code has been criticised for its Banking Code Compliance Committee not being fully independent in its oversight because its members will be appointed by banks. For the Code to be effective, some have argued that it should include basic tenets recommended by the Royal Commissioner in his interim report and to make it strictly liable in law and breaches criminal.

See also

British Bankers' Association
Thinkmoney

References

Banking in the United Kingdom